Henri Barda is a French classical pianist born in Cairo.

Biography 
A student of Polish pianist Ignace Tiegerman, Henri Barda worked in Paris with Lazare Lévy, then entered the Conservatoire de Paris, where he obtained the first prize in piano and chamber music, with the friendship and advice of Joseph Benvenuti, and Jean Hubeau.

He then entered the Juilliard School in New York for four years, where he was taught by Carlos Buhler, Beveridge Webster and Paul Makanovitsky, perfecting his training by attending classes in writing and pedagogy. The diploma he received was accompanied by an exceptional distinction.

Henri Barda has performed in both Europe and the United States, and has toured extensively in Japan, where he performed with the NHK Orchestra.

Invited to numerous festivals in France and abroad, he has made several recordings, notably with Jean-Jacques Kantorow a collection of works for violin and piano by Liszt (Franz Liszt International Prize of Budapest, 1978), as well as the three Chopin Sonatas (Frédéric Chopin International Prize of Warsaw, 1990).

Henri Barda has also worked with American choreographer Jerome Robbins, for ballets created on works by Chopin, with the Étoiles of the Opéra de Paris. A decisive experience, since Henri Barda has continued this close collaboration with dance for more than ten years, both on stage at the Palais Garnier and on international tours.

Henri Barda is professor of piano at the Conservatoire de Paris.

Discography 
Rare to discs, Henri Barda has recorded only 5 albums:
 Frédéric Chopin's Piano Sonata No. 1, Piano Sonata No. 2, Piano Sonata No. 3, (CD, Calliope, 1984)
 Maurice Ravel's Piano Trio, Violin Sonata No. 2 (CD, Calliope, 1990)
 Ignace Tiegerman's Meditation (1998)
 Olivier Greif's Sonate n°1 pour violon et piano, Sonate pour piano Codex Domini - Wiener Konzert, Cinq Lieder pour voix et piano - Le Tombeau de Ravel pour piano à quatre Mains - Concert "Live à l'archipel" with Jong Hwa Park (CD, 2008)
 Johannes Brahms, Ludwig van Beethoven, Frédéric Chopin, In Japan Kioi Hall, Tokyo, 2008 (CD, Sisyphe Records, 2011)

References

External links 
 Henri Barda on France Musique
 Henri Barda on Esprit du piano
 Website of the Académies of Nancy
 Website of the grand prix du disque Frédéric Chopin
 Website of the Conservatoire de Paris
 "Leçon d’humilité avec Henri Barda", Libération, 3 September 2012 
 Website of the École normale de musique de Paris
 Henri Barda plays Chopin - Ballades n. 1,2, 3, 4 (2008 - Steinway) (YouTube)

Musicians from Cairo
21st-century French male classical pianists
Conservatoire de Paris alumni
Juilliard School alumni
Academic staff of the Conservatoire de Paris
Academic staff of the École Normale de Musique de Paris
Year of birth missing (living people)
Living people